Chester Castle Bolton (September 5, 1882 – October 29, 1939) was a U.S. Representative from Ohio. He served four consecutive terms from 1929 to 1937. He was elected to a fifth term in 1938, but he died before completing the term.

He was the husband of Frances P. Bolton, who succeeded him in Congress, and the father of Oliver P. Bolton. Frances and Oliver Bolton would themselves become the first mother and son to serve simultaneously in Congress.

Life and career
Born in Cleveland, Ohio, Bolton attended the city's public schools.  He graduated from the University School in Cleveland in 1901, and from Harvard University in 1905, where he was a member of the Delphic Club.

Chester Castle Bolton and Frances Payne Bingham Bolton were married in 1907. They had 4 children, Charles B. Bolton, Oliver Payne, Kenyon C., and Elizabeth Bolton.

Bolton was a business industrialist in the steel industry in Cleveland from 1905 to 1917.  He served as member of the Ohio National Guard from 1905 to 1915.

World War I
Bolton was commissioned as a captain in the Reserve Corps, and then was ordered into active service in March 1917, in World War I.  He was detailed first to the War Industries Board, and then served as aide to the Assistant Secretary of War.  He was transferred to the General Staff in 1917.  He was promoted to the rank of lieutenant colonel and detailed to the One Hundred and First Division as Assistant Chief of Staff, and was discharged in December 1918.

He returned to Cleveland, Ohio, and served as a director of several large business corporations, and also engaged in raising and breeding a renowned Guernsey cattle herd at Franchester Farms, on the Bolton's 65 acre family estate 'Franchester Place' in Lyndhurst, Ohio.

Politics
He served as member of the Lyndhurst Village Council from 1918 to 1921.

Bolton served in the Ohio State Senate during 1923–1928, and served as its president pro tempore in 1927 and 1928.

He served as delegate to the Republican National Convention in 1928.

Bolton was elected as a Republican congressman representing Ohio's 22nd congressional district to the Seventy-first and to the three succeeding Congresses, serving from 1929 until 1937. He served as chairman of the Republican Congressional Campaign Committee in 1934 and 1936.

He was an unsuccessful candidate for reelection as congressperson in 1936 to the Seventy-fifth Congress.

Bolton was elected to the Seventy-sixth Congress, again representing the 22nd district, serving from January 3, 1939, until his death in October 1939. His wife, Frances P. Bolton, was elected to serve out his term and was repeatedly reelected by the 22nd District through the late 1960s, serving for 29 years.

Death
Chester C. Bolton died on October 29, 1939, in Cleveland. He was interred in Lake View Cemetery. Oliver P. Bolton, his son, was interred there in 1972. Frances P. Bolton, his wife, was interred there in 1977.

See also
 List of United States Congress members who died in office (1900–49)

References

Sources

External links
 "Gateway to Paradise: Bingham-Bolton-Blossom Estate in Palm Beach" — Casa Apava, estate of Frances Payne Bolton & Chester Bolton.

Ohio city council members
Republican Party Ohio state senators
1882 births
1939 deaths
Politicians from Cleveland
People from Lyndhurst, Ohio
People from Palm Beach, Florida
Burials at Lake View Cemetery, Cleveland
Harvard University alumni
Presidents of the Ohio State Senate
American military personnel of World War I
United States Army colonels
20th-century American politicians
Republican Party members of the United States House of Representatives from Ohio